The superior frontal gyrus is situated above the superior frontal sulcus and is continued on to the medial surface of the hemisphere, the medial frontal gyrus. The medial and superior frontal gyri are two of the frontal gyri of the frontal lobe. The portion on the lateral surface of the hemisphere is usually more or less completely subdivided into an upper and a lower part by an antero-posterior sulcus, the paramedial sulcus, which, however, is frequently interrupted by bridging gyri.

There is some evidence that it plays a role in executive mechanisms.

References

Gyri
Frontal lobe